Gale Hamilton Stalker (November 7, 1889 – November 4, 1985) was a Republican member of the United States House of Representatives from New York.

Early life and education
Gale H. Stalker was born in Long Eddy in Sullivan County, New York on November 7, 1889.  He studied at Scranton Business College in Scranton, Pennsylvania, which is now Lackawanna College. He then moved to Elmira, New York.

Career
Stalker was active in lumber and oil and gas businesses, banking, and other ventures. During World War I, he was nicknamed "Tent Peg" because his lumber company filled a contract to provide millions of tent poles and pegs to the United States Army.

He was elected to Congress in 1922 and served from March 4, 1923 until January 3, 1935. 

He died on November 4, 1985, in Palm Bay, Florida and was buried at Hillside Cemetery in Ormond Beach, Florida.

Sources

External links

 
 

1889 births
1985 deaths
Politicians from Elmira, New York
People from Palm Bay, Florida
American businesspeople in the oil industry
American bankers
Republican Party members of the United States House of Representatives from New York (state)
20th-century American politicians
Lackawanna College alumni